Watches of Switzerland is a British retailer of Swiss watches, with 16 stores in the United Kingdom. The company headquarters is in Braunstone, England. It is listed on the London Stock Exchange and is a constituent of the FTSE 250 Index.

History

Watches of Switzerland was founded in Ludgate Hill in 1924. During the late 1970s Theo Paphitis, the entrepreneur, worked as a sales assistant at the Bond Street Watches of Switzerland store in London.

The business was acquired by Ratners in 1988 but then sold on to Asprey in the early 1990s. The company was the subject of a management buyout from Asprey in 1998. It was then acquired, along with Mappin & Webb, by Baugur Group in November 2005. It was then bought by Landsbanki in 2009 before coming under the control of Apollo Global Management in 2013. The company was briefly known as Aurum Holdings before re-branding itself as Watches of Switzerland in advance of an initial public offering on the London Stock Exchange in May 2019.

References

Jewellery retailers of the United Kingdom
Retail companies of England
Companies based in Leicester
Watch brands
Companies listed on the London Stock Exchange